New England was an electoral district of the Legislative Assembly in the then colony of New South Wales.

Initially created in 1859 in the New England region of northern New South Wales, it partly replaced the Electoral district of New England and Macleay.

Originally electing one member, New England elected two members from 1880 to 1891 and three members from 1891 to 1894. With the introduction of single-member electorates in 1894, New England was replaced by Armidale, Uralla-Walcha and Bingara.

Members for New England

Election results

References

Former electoral districts of New South Wales
Constituencies established in 1859
1859 establishments in Australia
Constituencies disestablished in 1894
1894 disestablishments in Australia
Electoral district of New England